ATP-dependent metalloprotease YME1L1 is an enzyme that in humans is encoded by the YME1L1 gene. YME1L1 belongs to the AAA family of ATPases and mainly functions in the maintenance of mitochondrial morphology. Mutations in this gene would cause infantile-onset mitochondriopathy.

Structure

Gene
The YME1L1 gene is located at chromosome 10p14, consisting of 20 exons. Two transcript variants encoding different isoforms have been found for this gene.

Protein
YME1L1 consists of 716 amino acids and is highly similar to all mitochondrial AAA proteases and in particular to yeast Yme1p. Three different domains are identified via sequence analysis, including an AAA consensus sequence between amino acids 317 and 502, an ATP/GTP binding motif, and a HEXXH motif typical of a zinc-dependent binding domain.

Function 

YME1L1 is embedded in the inner mitochondrial membrane and is more abundant in tissues with a high content of mitochondria such as human adult heart, skeletal muscle, and pancreas RNA. YME1L1 is a member of the AAA family of ATPases and has an important role for the maintenance of mitochondrial morphology.  Its mature form assembles into a homo-oligomeric complex within the inner mitochondrial membrane (IM). It degrades both intermembrane space and IM proteins, including lipid transfer proteins, components of protein translocases of the IM, and the dynamin-like GTPase optic atrophy 1 (OPA1)  Loss of YME1L1 accelerates OMA1-dependent long-form OPA1 cleavage, resulting in short-form OPA1 accumulation, increased mitochondrial fission, and mitochondrial network fragmentation. It's also reported that YME1L1 controls the accumulation of respiratory chain subunits and is required for apoptotic resistance, cristae morphogenesis, and cell proliferation.

Clinical significance

A homozygous mutation in the YME1L1 gene would cause infantile-onset mitochondriopathy, with severe intellectual disability, muscular impairments, and optic nerve atrophy. The missense mutation affects the MPP processing site and impairs YME1L1 maturation, leading to its rapid degradation, and also leads to a proliferation defect, abnormal OPA1 processing and mitochondrial fragmentation.

Interactions 

OPA1 
OMA1

References

Further reading